Ville or "town", but its meaning in the Middle Ages was "farm" (from Gallo-Romance VILLA < Latin villa rustica) and then "village". The derivative suffix -ville is commonly used in names of cities, towns and villages, particularly throughout France, Canada and the United States.

Usage in France 
In France, after the 6th Century, especially in the North, first of all Normandy (20% of the communes end with -ville), Beauce and French speaking part of Lorraine. In the Southeast, they are exceptional and modern. In the Southwest, -ville is very often a translation of the Occitan -viala (Gascon -viela), sometimes ill gallicized in -vielle (variant -fielle). There are almost all combined with the landowner's name. f. e : Colleville, Normandy, with Colle- that represents the Old Norse personal name Koli. The oldest recorded example of a -ville place-name in Normandy is Bourville as Bodardi villa in 715. Other rates indicate that there are only 1 068 -ville communes out of 36 591 communes in France (if we exclude the -viale, -viel[l]e, -fielle variant forms of the Southwest), but 460 out of 1 068 are located in Normandy (more than 1/3) for a total number of 3 332 communes in Normandy (36 591 in France).

In England, after the Norman Conquest in 1066, some names of individuals gained -ville endings, but not many place names did, Bournville in Birmingham that came to use in the late 19th century was more for standing out than historic. These names are however still a reference to places, either in Normandy or elsewhere in France, such as Carville found as a last name in Yorkshire or Dunstanville found as a last name in Kent (cf. the placename Dénestanville, spelled Dunestanvilla in the 11th century).

Usage in Canada 
Although a ville in the predominantly francophone Canadian province of Quebec may be informally referred to as a "city" or a "town" in English, no distinction exists under provincial law between those two types of settlements. The "city" of Montreal, with a population of 1,854,442 in the Canada 2006 Census, and the "town" of Barkmere, with a population of just 58, are both legally villes.

Quebec does have several other types of municipal status, including municipalities, townships and villages, but any distinction between cities and towns in English has no basis in law and no objective criteria to differentiate between the two. However, in villes with a large anglophone population, there may be an established—albeit informal—preference. For instance, Mount Royal is nearly always referred to as a town—as opposed to a city—by its anglophone populace, while places such as Montreal, Quebec City, Trois-Rivières, Sherbrooke, Saguenay and Gatineau are virtually always referred to as cities.

Cité is a defunct title that currently is used only officially by Dorval, which is nevertheless legally a ville.

In all other Canadian provinces, although ville is still used as the French translation for both "city" and "town", cities and towns there do have distinct legal status from each other.

In New Brunswick, Canada's only constitutionally bilingual province, ville is commonly used to refer to both cities and towns; however, the official translation of city in provincial law is cité.

As in the United States, -ville may also be a suffix that is part of a city's or a town's actual name. This usage exists in both English and French; examples include Oakville, Brockville and Belleville in Ontario, Blainville, Drummondville, Victoriaville and Louiseville in Quebec, Wolfville in Nova Scotia and Parksville in British Columbia. In Quebec, it may also be used as a prefix, as in Ville-Marie or Villeroy.

Ville, as a suffix or prefix within a geographic name, may also sometimes denote an unincorporated neighbourhood within a larger city, such as Ville-Émard, Davisville, Unionville, or Africville.

There are also places named after people, such as Villeray.

Usage in the United States 
According to toponymist George R. Stewart, the use of the suffix -ville for settlements in the United States did not begin until after the American Revolution. Previously, town-names did not usually use suffixes unless named after European towns in which case the name was borrowed wholly. When a suffix was needed, -town (or the separate word Town) was typically added (as in Charleston, South Carolina, originally Charles Town). In the middle of the 18th century the suffixes -borough (-boro) and -burgh (-burg) came into style. The use of -town (-ton) also increased, in part due to the increasing use of personal names for new settlements. Thus the settlement founded by William Trent became known as Trenton. These three suffixes, -town/-ton, -borough/-boro, and -burgh/-burg became popular before the Revolution, while -ville was almost completely unused until afterward. Its post-revolutionary popularity, along with the decline in the use of -town, was due in part to the pro-French sentiments which spread through the country after the war. The founding of Louisville, Kentucky, in 1780, for example, used not only the French suffix but the name of the French king, Louis XVI. The popularity of -ville was most popular in the southern and western (Appalachian) regions of the new country, and less popular in New England.

A few -ville names pre-date the revolution, but most of them are named after persons whose name refers to European settlements or dukedoms. For example, Granville, Massachusetts was named for the Earl of Granville (he was named himself after Granville, Manche (Normandy)). After the revolution and the decline in the use of -borough and -town, the two suffixes -ville and -burgh/-burg became by far the most popular for many decades. A difference between the usage of the two is that -burgh/-burg was almost always appended to personal names while -ville was added to a variety of words.

By the middle of the 19th century the -ville suffix began to lose its popularity, with newly popular suffixes with -wood, -hurst, -mere, -dale, and others taking over. However, the -ville suffix is still associated with the name of settlements in language use and popular culture.

Notable -ville cities in the United States 

 Abbeville, Louisiana
 Amityville, New York
 Argusville, North Dakota
 Asheville, North Carolina
 Barbourville, Kentucky
 Barhamsville, Virginia
 Beattyville, Kentucky
 Belleville, Illinois
 Bennettsville, South Carolina
 Bentonville, Arkansas
 Bronxville, New York
 Brownsville, Texas
 Campbellsville, Kentucky
 Centreville, Virginia
 Charlottesville, Virginia
 Clarksville, Tennessee
 Collierville, Tennessee
 Connersville, Indiana
 Crawfordsville, Indiana
 Danville, California
 Danville, Virginia
 Dawsonville, Georgia
 Eddyville, Kentucky
 Evansville, Indiana
 Fayetteville, Arkansas
 Fayetteville, Georgia
 Fayetteville, North Carolina
 Fortville, Indiana
 Gainesville, Florida
 Gainesville, Georgia
 Gainesville, Virginia
 Greeneville, Tennessee
 Greenville, Alabama
 Greenville, Mississippi
 Greenville, North Carolina
 Greenville, South Carolina
 Hendersonville, North Carolina
 Hendersonville, Tennessee
 Hodgenville, Kentucky
 Hopkinsville, Kentucky
 Huntersville, North Carolina
 Huntsville, Alabama
 Huntsville, Texas
 Jacksonville, Florida
 Jacksonville, North Carolina
 Jeffersonville, Indiana
 Jordanville, New York
 Kendallville, Indiana
 Knoxville, Tennessee
 Lewisville, Texas
 Louisville, Kentucky
 Louisville, Mississippi
 Mayville, North Dakota
 McCordsville, Indiana
 McMinnville, Oregon
 Naperville, Illinois
 Nashville, Tennessee
 Nicholasville, Kentucky
 Noblesville, Indiana
 Paintsville, Kentucky
 Pflugerville, Texas
 Pikeville, Kentucky
 Plainville, Massachusetts
 Porterville, California
 Reidsville, North Carolina
 Rockville, Maryland
 Roseville, California
 Rushville, Indiana
 Salyersville, Kentucky
 Shelbyville, Tennessee
 Shepherdsville, Kentucky
 Snellville, Georgia
 Somerville, Massachusetts
 Statesville, North Carolina
 Starkville, Mississippi
 Steubenville, Ohio
 Swoyersville, Pennsylvania
 Thomasville, Georgia
 Thomasville, North Carolina
 Vacaville, California
 Victorville, California
 Waterville, Maine
 Whiteville, North Carolina
 Wilsonville, Oregon
 Zanesville, Ohio

-ville in popular culture
Antville, an underground city in the animation Anthony Ant
Coolsville, the setting of the Scooby-Doo cartoon franchise
Danville, the setting of the American animated TV series Phineas and Ferb
Dogville, a 2003 drama film
FarmVille, a 2009 farming video game
Hooterville, the setting of the American TV series Petticoat Junction and Green Acres
Hooverville, an area where homeless people generally lived during the Great Depression
Pleasantville, a 1998 American feature film
Psychoville a British television series
Retroville, the setting of the American animated TV series The Adventures of Jimmy Neutron: Boy Genius
Smallville, an American television series
Smallville, a town in the Superman comics
Shelbyville, a fictional city in the American animated TV series The Simpsons
Stylesville, the setting of the American animated TV series Bratz
Townsville, the setting of the American animated TV series The Powerpuff Girls
Whoville, a fictional town created by author Theodor Seuss Geisel, under the name Dr. Seuss
Whyville, an educational website targeted at children

References

External links

French words and phrases
Ville

Place name element etymologies